Reitumetse Moloisane (born 17 February 1985) is a Mosotho footballer who currently plays as a striker for Lesotho Prison Service. Since 2008, he has won 13 caps and scored one goal for the Lesotho national football team.

External links

Association football forwards
Lesotho footballers
Lesotho international footballers
1985 births
Living people